Mojokerto ( (Måjåkěrtå)) is a city in East Java Province, Indonesia. It is located 40 km southwest of Surabaya, and constitutes one of the component units of the Surabaya metropolitan area (known as Gerbangkertosusila) which comprises Gresik Regency, Bangkalan Regency, Mojokerto Regency, Mojokerto City, Surabaya City, Sidoarjo Regency, and Lamongan Regency. The city had a population of 120,196 at the 2010 census and 132,434 at the 2020 Census; the official estimate as at mid 2021 was 133,272.

Administrative districts

The city of Mojokerto is administratively divided into three districts (kecamatan), tabulated below with areas and their population at the 2010 and 2020 Censuses, together with the official estimates as at mid 2021.

Note: (a) Kranggan District created since 2010 from parts of the other two districts; its population in 2010 is included with that of the districts from which it was formed.

They districts are divided into 12 urban "villages", listed below with their 2010 populations:

 Kecamatan Prajurit Kulon 
 Surodinawan (6,952)
 Prajurit Kulon (6,432)
 Blooto (5,358)
 Mentikan (5,977)
 Kauman (2,820)
 Pulorejo (6,557)
 Kecamatan Magersari 
 Gunung Gedangan (6,263)
 Kedundung (13,381)
 Purwotengah (1,913)
 Gedongan (2,023)
 Magersari (5,085)
 Wates (18,296)
 Kecamatan Kranggan 
 Jagalan (2,926)
 Sentanan (2,072)
 Kranggan (11,370)
 Miji (7,717)
 Meri (7,825)
 Balongsari (7,229)

Economy
Mojokerto occupies a strategic position and role in East Java. It functions as a reliable sustaining stock of foodstuff and tourist attraction. PPLH (Pusat Pendidikan Lingkungan Hidup – Seloliman Environmental Education Centre) is located in Mojokerto, it is a non-governmental organization aiming to further raise environmental awareness.
Historically, Mojokerto is widely known as the then center of Wetan Mas Kingdom of King Airlangga (1029/1041), and of Majapahit Kingdom with its Brawijaya dynasty (1292–1400) and its territories exceeding Nusantara (standardized concept of Indonesian archipelagic territories).

Mojokerto has a motto of "Kota Budi Parinda"

Etymology
The name "Mojokerto" is a local Javanese pronunciation of the Javanese words "Maja" and "Karta".  The word Maja is the same as that of Majapahit, and originates from the word 'bael fruit' that was found at the location of the new capital of Majapahit Empire.  Karta and Kerta mean 'Fortress', therefore Mojokerto means 'Fortress of Majapahit'.

The Seven Age Anniversary Plan of Majapahit Glory
Since four years ago, there have been several cultural fairs in East Java, lasting for a week. Some 37 districts participated. These activities have been held in alternate towns and cities such as Surabaya, Malang, Jember, Madiun. The activities were aimed at utilizing East Java’s specific potentials either in the form of traditional arts or special foods in the framework of marketing tourist attractions of East Java. This year coinciding with the year of the Green Environment, of Tourist Visit, and of Seven-Age commemoration stipulated Mojokerto as the site for holding cultural fair.
For this purpose local and provincial committee are and have been taking the following measures:
 To hold a symposium on the verge of seven-age anniversary of Majapahit and to carry any book-writing concerning Majapahit
 To designate the year of Green Environment by planting rare plants in the area Majapahit remains; thirty seven Kabupaten in East Java Province will participate on this occasion.
 To innovate Majapahit’s artifacts (archaeological remains)
 To establish facilities at tourist attractions

Various activities being arranged are as follows:
 East Java’s cultural and tourist fair reflecting the glory of Majapahit
 Archaeological Exhibition
 Seminars of archaeologists and historians
 Cultural arts and festivals
 Introduction to tourist attractions

The above-mentioned events took place from July 5 to July 15, 1993. Some foreign tourists came from China, Finland, Denmark, Malaysia and the Middle East.

Climate
Mojokerto has a tropical savanna climate with moderate to little rainfall from May to November and heavy to very heavy rainfall from December to April.

External links
 About Mojokerto
 Government Website, District
 Government Website, City

References

 
Populated places in East Java